Summer Sports: Paradise Island is a sports video game developed and published by Destineer for Nintendo's Wii. The game was released in North America on April 15, 2008.

The game is a collection of seven sports games similar to Wii Sports, ranging from croquet to mini-golf. The game received mostly mediocre reviews from critics, who felt that the game looked appropriately nice but was lacking in gameplay.

Gameplay

Summer Sports features seven different sports: basketball, badminton, beach volleyball, horseshoes, lawn darts, mini-golf, and croquet. The basketball game does not contain a full game of basketball, but instead allows players to play horse, Around the World, and shot clock. Horseshoes and lawn darts play their respective normal games using Wii Remote motion controls. Beach volleyball and badminton also play like their normal counterparts, and use motion controls. Mini-golf and croquet include a power meter which measures the player's strength on their shots, giving the player accurate feedback.

Characters

Males
 Jackie (Los Angeles, California)
 Trevor (Old Bridge, New Jersey)
 Sanchez (Dallas, Texas)
 Matt (New York City, New York)
 Raj (New Orleans, Louisiana)

Females
 Lucy (Minneapolis, Minnesota)
 Maria (Santa Monica, California)
 Hema (Boston, Massachusetts)
 Tiana (Portland, Oregon)
 Sarah (Chicago, Illinois)

Mini Golf Courses

First 3
 Temple of the Feathered Serpent - A course based on Mayan civilization, players have to watch out for the flipping platforms, which it comes out of a dragon's mouth and goes back to your starting position.
 Ghouls Graveyard - A course based on a haunted graveyard guarded by zombies and villains, which players can hear laughing in the background.
 Congo Falls - A course based on Africa's savanna featuring animals like an elephant, a lion, and a hippopotamus.

Mid 3
 Course of the Sphinx - A course based on the pyramids and Sphinx in Giza, Egypt, whilst players have to avoid the Sphinx blowing their ball away.
 Medieval Madness - A Medieval castle-themed course based on Europe's Middle Ages.
 Dynamite Hill - An Old Western-themed course featuring a TNT gunpowder cannon which sends your ball down a mine, and buildings featuring a saloon, general store, and a train station called Jefferson Station.

Last 3
 Buccaneer's Booty - A pirate-themed course featuring the shape of a skeleton, a tentacled creature,a cannon, treasure chests, and a ship wheel.
 Delta Base - A course based on outer space and technology which at the end a UFO glows on the golf pole.
 Primeval Peak - A dinosaur-themed course featuring the peak of a volcano whilst the player has to avoid the dinosaur moving the wood off its head.

Reception
Summer Sports: Paradise Island received mostly mediocre reviews from critics, who found fault with the game's control scheme; the game received a 53.3% from GameRankings. IGN's Daemon Hatfield criticized the game, stating that five of the seven mini-games were "terrible" and that the other two were "okay". He noted that the instruction manual for the game was misprinted, giving instructions for basketball three times, and croquet and horseshoes instructions twice, while neglecting to have anything about the other four games. Gaming Nexus's Cyril Lachel felt that the compilation was, "not as consistent" as one would hope.

References

2008 video games
Basketball video games
North America-exclusive video games
Multiple-sport video games
Video games developed in the United States
Beach volleyball video games
Wii games
Wii-only games
Multiplayer and single-player video games